Rhodora is a peer-reviewed scientific journal published by the New England Botanical Club. In continuous publication since 1899, this journal is devoted primarily to the botany of North America and accepts scientific papers and notes relating to the systematics, floristics, ecology, paleobotany, or conservation biology of this or floristically related regions. Rhodora is issued four times a year, typically totaling 450 printed pages annually.

, Melanie Schori is the appointed Editor-in-Chief of Rhodora and Kathleen McCauley is Managing Editor. Lisa Standley is editor for "The Botanists' Corner."

References

External links
 
 Rhodora online archive

Botany journals
Publications established in 1899
Quarterly journals
English-language journals
1899 establishments in the United States